Ethan Allen Andrews (April 7, 1787 – March 4, 1858) was an American lexicographer and educator. He published a major Latin dictionary in 1850 and served in the Connecticut House of Representatives in 1851 and was a Whig.

Life
Andrews was born in New Britain, Connecticut, and graduated at Yale in 1810. He practiced law for several years, then (1822–1828) was professor of ancient languages at the University of North Carolina, after which he taught at New Haven and Boston. He married Lucy Cowles Andrews, with whom he had one son, Horace.

He died on March 4, 1858, in New Britain.

Works
He published a number of Latin textbooks and in 1850 a Latin-English lexicon, a reduced version of Wilhelm Freund's German translation of Egidio Forcellini's 1771 dictionary, which became known as Andrews' Lexicon. It went through many revisions and came to be known as Harper's Latin Dictionary (1907). He published a Latin grammar with his Yale classmate Solomon Stoddard, long very popular.  A monograph, Slavery and the Domestic Slave Trade in the United States, was printed in Boston in 1836. Other publications  include "First Latin Book"; "Latin Reader"; "Viri Romae"; "Latin Lessons"; "Andrews' and Stoddard's Latin Grammar"; "Synopsis of Latin Grammar"; "Questions on the Latin Grammar"; "Latin Exercises"; "Key to Latin Exercises"; "Exercises in Latin Etymology"; "Caesar's Commentaries"; "Sallust"; and "Ovid".

Books
Slavery and the Domestic Slave Trade in the United States (Boston, 1836)

Edited volumes
Leisure Hours: A Choice Collection of Readings in Prose (Boston, 1844)

Reference works
A Copious and Critical Latin-English Lexicon Founded on the Larger Latin-German Lexicon of Dr. Wilhelm Freund (New York, 1851)

Textbooks
A Grammar of the Latin Language for Use of Schools and Colleges with Soloman Stoddard (Boston, 1836)
Questions upon Andrews' and Stoddard's Latin Grammar (Boston and New York, 1836)
First Lessons in Latin (New York and Boston, 1837)
The First Part of Jacobs and Doring's Latin Reader (Boston, 1837)
Latin Exercises (Boston, 1837)
A Key to Latin Exercises (Boston, 1837)
A First Latin Book or Progressive Lessons in Reading and Writing Latin (Boston, 1846)
A Synopsis of Latin Grammar (Boston, 1851)
Exercises in Latin Etymology (Boston, 1855)
A Manual of Latin Grammar (Boston, 1859)

Translations
Sallust's History of the War against Jugurtha, and of the Conspiracy of Catiline (New Haven, 1841)
Lhomond's Virie Romae (Boston, 1842)
C. Julius Caeser's Commentaries on the Gallic War (Boston, 1846)

References

Further reading
 Hubbard Winslow, Eulogy on the Late Professor E. A. Andrews (Boston, 1858)  
 "A History of Harper's Latin Dictionary." (1972). Harvard Library Bulletin 20: 349–366.

External links
 
 Guide to the Ethan Allen Andrews papers, Manuscripts and Archives, Yale University Library
 

1787 births
1858 deaths
Writers from New Britain, Connecticut
19th-century American educators
Yale University alumni
American lexicographers
Members of the Connecticut House of Representatives
Connecticut Whigs
19th-century American politicians
19th-century lexicographers
Educators from Connecticut
19th-century American non-fiction writers
19th-century American male writers
American male non-fiction writers